Puppygate may refer to:

Lucy Lucy Apple Juice story arc in The Real Housewives of Beverly Hills season 9 
 2015 Hugo Awards controversy